The United Progressive Alliance is a political party in Kenya.

History 
The party contested the 2022 Kenyan general election as part of the Azimio La Umoja political alliance and one MP was elected to the 13th Parliament of Kenya.

References 

Political parties in Kenya